Gully is the surname of:

 James Manby Gully (1808–1883), English medical doctor known for practising hydrotherapy
 John Gully (1783–1863), English prize-fighter, horse racer and politician
 John Gully (artist) (1819–1888), New Zealand landscape painter
 William Gully, 1st Viscount Selby (1835–1909), British lawyer and politician, son of James Gully

See also
 Gulley, another surname